Turovice is a municipality and village in Přerov District in the Olomouc Region of the Czech Republic. It has about 200 inhabitants.

History
The first written mention of Turovice is from 1131.

References

Villages in Přerov District